The Cypress is a monthly newspaper that is published by students at Brookline High School in Brookline, Massachusetts.

It is "an independent, school-affiliated publication produced monthly by the students of Brookline High School," according to the paper's website. Each issue consists of five sections: NEWS, OPINIONS, CENTERSPREAD, ARTS, and SPORTS. Issues are distributed free of charge in and around Brookline High School on "distribution days. Its name was changed from The Sagamore to The Cypress in 2023.

Staff 
Cypress staff members take Journalism I and Journalism II classes, which complement their work on the paper. Depending on how long a student has served on the staff, different positions become available to them.

In a student's first year, they are restricted to a basic journalist position as a staff writer. This involves conducting interviews and writing articles as they learn about journalistic ethics, procedures, and skills in the accompanying Journalism I class.

In the second year, the faculty advisors assign leadership positions. These include section writing, section layout editing, photo, and business team. These positions are in addition to the responsibilities of the first year, but the Journalism II class includes more production time.

Third-year students, in the Journalism II class along with second-year students, are assigned to a different set of jobs at The Cypress, including the position of editor-in-chief (EIC). This position is shared between two or three students selected by the advisers.

Funding 
Brookline high school provides The Cypress staff with a work space and some resources (such as computers and recording devices); however, the staff raises the funds for printing, mailing, etc. through ad sales subscriptions. The business team manages the income. The newspaper's funding comes from advertising and subscriptions only.

Online presence 
The Cypress website includes not only articles from the paper issues, but also online exclusives and features such as school calendars and files. The Cypress also has several social media accounts, including a Facebook page, an Instagram account, a TikTok account, and a Twitter account.

Awards 

 Columbia Scholastic Press Association Newspaper Critique
 2020 Silver Medalist
 2019 Gold Medalist
 2017 Gold Medalist
 2016 Gold Medal Finalist
 2015 Silver Crown Award
 2014 Silver Crown Award
 2013 Gold Medalist
 2012 Gold Medalist
 2010 Gold Medalist
 New England Scholastic Press Association Special Achievement Awards
 2020 Highest Achievement: Class I, Print/online
 2019 Highest Achievement: Class I, Print/online
 2017 Highest Achievement: Class I, Print/online
 2017 All-New England: First Place, Class I, Print/online
 2016 Highest Achievement: Class I, Print/online
 2016 All-New England: First Place, Class I, Print/online
 2015 Highest Achievement: Class I, Print/online
 2014 Highest Achievement: Class I, Print/Online Newspaper
 2013 All-New England: Class I, Newspaper, Second Place
 2013 Highest Achievement: Class I, Newspaper
 2012 All-New England: Class I, Newspaper, Second Place
 2012 Highest Achievement: Class I, Newspaper
 2011 Highest Achievement, Newspaper Class I
 2011 Highest Achievement, Newspaper Class I

 Suffolk University Greater Boston High School Newspaper Competition
 2019 First Place for Excellence in News Writing
 2015 First Place for Excellence in Sports Writing
 2012 First Place in Excellence in News Writing

References

External links
 Official Site

Brookline, Massachusetts
High school newspapers published in the United States
Education in Norfolk County, Massachusetts
Mass media in Norfolk County, Massachusetts